Roberto Maytín and Fernando Romboli were the defending champions but chose not to defend their title.

Orlando Luz and Rafael Matos won the title after defeating Sekou Bangoura and Donald Young 7–6(7–2), 6–2 in the final.

Seeds

Draw

References

External links
 Main draw

2021 ATP Challenger Tour
2021 Doubles